Schistura is a genus of fish in the stone loach family Nemacheilidae native to the streams and rivers of the southern and eastern Asia. Some of these species are troglobitic.

Species
There are currently over 200 recognized species in this genus:

See also
 Sgouros, Katherine; Lawrence M. Page; Sarah A. Orlofske; and Robert C. Jadin (2019). A Revised Molecular Phylogeny Reveals Polyphyly in Schistura (Teleostei: Cypriniformes: Nemacheilidae). Zootaxa 4559(2): 349–362.

References

 
Freshwater fish genera
Freshwater fish of Asia
Taxa named by John McClelland (doctor)
Taxonomy articles created by Polbot